Sympetrum illotum, the cardinal meadowhawk, is a species of skimmer in the dragonfly family Libellulidae. It is found in the Caribbean Sea, Central America, North America, and South America.

The IUCN conservation status of Sympetrum illotum is "LC", least concern, with no immediate threat to the species' survival. The population is stable. The IUCN status was reviewed in 2017.

Subspecies
These three subspecies belong to the species Sympetrum illotum:
 Sympetrum illotum gilvum Brauer, 1868
 Sympetrum illotum illotum (Hagen, 1861)
 Sympetrum illotum virgulum (Selys, 1884)

References

Further reading

External links

 

Libellulidae
Articles created by Qbugbot
Insects described in 1861